Brussels has an extensive network of both private or public transportation means. Public transportation includes Brussels buses, trams, the Brussels metro (all three operated by the STIB as well as a set of railway lines (operated by Infrabel) and railway stations served by public trains (operated by the SNCB). Bicycle-sharing and car-sharing public systems are also available. Air transport is available via one of the city's two airports (the Brussels National Airport and the Brussels-South Charleroi Airport), and boat transport is available via the Port of Brussels. The city is relatively car-dependent by northern European standards and is considered to be the most congested city in the world according to the Inrix traffic survey.

The complexity of the Belgian political landscape makes some transportation issues difficult to solve. The Brussels Capital Region is surrounded by the Flemish and Walloon regions, which means that the airports, as well as many roads serving Brussels (most notably the Brussels Ring) are located in the other two Belgian regions.

Metro and light rail

Brussels metro

The Brussels metro was first opened in 1976 and has been expanding since, to comprise as of 2009 a set of four metro lines serving a total of 60 metro stations, most of which are underground. Line 1 connects the Brussels-West station to the east of the city. Line 2 runs in a loop around the city centre. Line 5 runs between the west to the south-east of the city via the centre. Line 6 connects the King Baudouin Stadium at the north-west of Brussels, to the city centre, ending by a loop around the centre in the same way as line 2. Lines 3 and 4 are operated by major Brussels trams.

Brussels trams

Brussels trams are an old transportation means in Brussels, operated by the STIB from 1954 on, but existing since 1869. The Brussels tram system evolved a lot over time, from a rise in the first half of the 20th century (246 km of tram rails were serviced in 1955) to a fall in the second half of the 20th century due to the popularisation of transport by bus and by car. In 1988 only 134 km of tram rails remained in Brussels. Finally, the reduced tram network was extended in the late 2000s with the extension of existing lines from 131 km in 2007 to 133 km in 2008.

Heavy rail
The Infrabel railway network has a total of eight lines used by passenger trains, which lie partly of completely within the region of Brussels. Those lines serve a total of 29 railway stations in Brussels, all of which offer connections with one or more MIVB/STIB bus, tram and/or metro lines. This system is planned to be upgraded to the Brussels Regional Express Network. Brussels-South railway station is a major station on the European High Speed train network, served by TGV, Thalys, Eurostar and ICE high speed train services.

Buses

The first Brussels bus ran in 1907 from the Brussels Stock Exchange to the Ixelles/Elsene city hall. The Brussels bus network now comprises 360 km of bus line by day and 112 km by night as of 2008, and service the 19 municipalities of Brussels. Buses operated by the Walloon (TEC) and Flemish (De Lijn) public transport companies also run in Brussels in order to allow Walloon and Flemish people to go to the capital city.

Roads

Brussels has the most congested traffic in North America and Europe according to a 2012 study by the US traffic information platform Inrix.

Roads in Brussels range from highways leading to neighbouring countries or cities(the European routes E40, E411 and E19 plus the A12 and A201 highways) to national roads, major roads down to local streets. Brussels is surrounded by the Brussels Ring, and is crossed by two smaller orbital roads: the Greater Ring and the Small Ring.

Brussels buses, trams, taxis, cars and bicycles share the road network in Brussels. A car-sharing system is operated by the public company STIB/MIVB with Cambio.

Airports
Brussels is served by two airports, the Brussels National Airport located in the neighbouring municipality of Zaventem can be accessed by highway (A201), train and bus and the Brussels-South Charleroi Airport located between Brussels and Charleroi in Gosselies, which can be accessed by highway (E19 then E420) or a private bus.

The Taiwanese EVA Air provides private bus services from Saint-Gilles (Sint-Gillis) (near the Brussels-South (Midi) railway station) to Amsterdam Schiphol Airport for its Belgian customers going to and from Taipei and/or Bangkok on flights departing from/arriving to Schiphol. The service is co-operated with Reizen Lauwers NV.

Water transport
Brussels has its own port and is crossed by the Brussels-Charleroi Canal and the Brussels–Scheldt Maritime Canal.

Cycling
Brussels is characterised by a relatively low level of cycling compared to Flanders and many other north-western European cities. The modal share is about 3.5% of all trips within Brussels, and 2.5% of all trips within, and entering/exiting the city. However, the rate has increased significantly in recent years. Since 2009 a bicycle-sharing system named Villo! has been made available to the public.

Brussels has a high number of cycling accidents compared with Belgian rural areas but due to the urban context, most cycling accidents in Brussels result in only slight injuries.

See also

 Brussels Regional Express Network
 Transport in Belgium

References

External links

 Brussels Capital Region website
 Brussels Mobility portal (in French) (in Dutch)
 STIB/MIVB website
 SNCB/NMBS website
 Taxi and Collecto in Brussels